Rolf Spring (19 March 1917 – 2005) was a Swiss rower who competed in the 1936 Summer Olympics.

In 1936 he was the coxswain of the Swiss boat which won the silver medal in the coxed four event. He also coxed the Swiss boat in the coxed pair competition when they finished fifth and in the eight event when they finished sixth.

External links
 profile
  

1917 births
2005 deaths
Swiss male rowers
Coxswains (rowing)
Olympic rowers of Switzerland
Rowers at the 1936 Summer Olympics
Olympic silver medalists for Switzerland
Olympic medalists in rowing
Medalists at the 1936 Summer Olympics